Sant Pere (Barri de Sant Pere in Catalan) is a neighborhood in District 1 (Ciutat Vella), the old city of Barcelona, Spain. It is named after the monastery Sant Pere de les Puelles. It is a part of the Sant Pere, Santa Caterina i la Ribera neighborhood.

Points of interest
The neighborhood received its name from the 10th century monastery of Sant Pere de les Puelles, (Saint Peter of the Innocents), at Lluís El Piadós 1. The monastery is named after girls that disfigured themselves to avoid rape and murder.

The Palau de la Música Catalana (Palace of Catalan Music) concert hall designed by Lluís Domènech i Montaner is located at Carrer Sant Francesc de Paula 2.

References

Neighbourhoods of Barcelona
Sant Pere, Santa Caterina i la Ribera